Bandar Utama Sixth Form College (formerly Sekolah Menengah Kebangsaan Bandar Utama) is a school located in Damansara subdivision of the Petaling District, Selangor, Malaysia. It was the first secondary school to be established in Bandar Utama. Originally serving Form 1-5 students, the school became a college for Form 6 students in 2018 and took its present name.

History
The school officially opened its doors in 1998 with 375 students. In 2008, the school was given the prestige to house Form Six students. SMK Bandar Utama officially closed its doors to Form 1-5 students in 2018 to become a fully-fledged Form 6 college, renamed Kolej Tingkatan 6 Bandar Utama.

Principals
 Puan Sarifah Yusof
 Puan Khadijah Hj. Hamzah
 Puan Chan Sim Ai
 Puan Hasni bt. Hassan
 Datin Seri Hajah Normah
 Puan Amiah Hassan
 Encik Ashaari

Administration
The headmistress is assisted by the Head of Student Affairs, Head of Co-curriculum, supervisors, and the Heads of departments. There are roughly 80 teachers in the school, in both the afternoon and morning session.

Prefectorial board
Teachers are assisted by the school's Prefectorial Board, which has more than 80 prefects in it including current probationary prefects. They were trained under prefect head teacher Mr. Lau.

Co-curriculum

Each year, the Domino's Pizza Safety Rodeo organises a safety rodeo in SMK Bandar Utama. The safety rodeo holds competitions and games to increase safety awareness on roads. The school choir is also an active co-curricular outfit, having participated in competitions in the school as well as beyond, such as PPD Teacher's Day Celebration 2010 and have performed for their third time in the annual 's Mother's Day event.

Jejak Utama: The Magazine
The school magazine known as Jejak Utama began publications in 2000, with the 2004 edition notably published in hardcover. The magazine serves as a record on school activities and features various reports on school events and co-curriculum activities. Various students' works such as short stories, comic strips and illustrations are also featured in the magazine.

Facilities
Three main blocks are dedicated to classrooms, laboratories, staff's room, the library, the general office, the Muslim prayer room and toilets. A canteen with a dining area and a separate teachers' lounge are located closest to the main gates. A horticulture shed stands near a two-storey computer lab.

In 2009, an Editorial Room was provided by the school. The room was stocked up with 3 brand new computers, a scanner and a printer. The Editorial Room served as the place where the school's editorial members edit and work on the production of the school magazine.

Achievements
The school emerged as winner in the Datuk Wira Arshad Debates in the year of 2004, 2005 and 2007. It has also received media coverage during the annual The Star National Best School Newspaper Competition in 2003, 2004 and 2005.

Sports
Holding the title of Overall Winner three years in a row for the Cross-country Championship of the Petaling District, SMK Bandar Utama athletes such as Shanti Armom, Arivinthakumar and Sathiaraj Rajoo have been representatives of the Petaling District and State of Selangor.

Drama
In 2004, the pioneering drama team, ted runner-up for the Interschool Drama Competition (Petaling district). “Sorry”, the original screenplay, told of the cross-parallel story of a man through his younger years to his eventual death. It garnered great reviews from the judging panel for its originality.

In 2007, the school drama team also garnered third place at the Interschool Drama Competition for the Damansara zone. Their drama entitled The Poser Dilemma featured a LaLa girl character, played by Form 4 student Yehga Nikkil who was nominated for the Best Actor award.

Pertandingan Menghias Akuarium
SMK Bandar Utama, under the Kelab Ikan Hiasan dan Tumbuhan Akuatik, participated as well in the Pertandingan Menghias Akuarium Peringkat Negeri Selangor in 2001 and 2002. The club won 1st place in both years and received prizes, which include cash, aquarium paraphernalia and certificates. The first competition was held in front of the Blue Wave Hotel, Shah Alam and the 2nd competition was held in Quality Hotel, also in Shah Alam. In their first competition in 2001, the aquarium arrangement was named Alam Tropika to depict the beauty and uniqueness of Malaysian tropical forest. In 2002, they chose the name Sanggar Tropikarium for their aquarium arrangement to portray the art of decorating aquarium with natural produce. Four of the most noted students who represented the club in both of the competitions were Mahathir Mustaffa, Abdul Subhan Mahfooz, Syamsul Anuar Yusril & Mohd Faizal Mokhtar, all of whom were from the class of 2003.

Scrabble
The school's Scrabble team which comprises both the Under-18 and Under-15 teams emerged as runners-up in the preliminary round of the 2007's Interschool Scrabble Competition, thus qualifying for the Zone Level Interschool Scrabble Tournament. The Under-18 team placed 3rd at the tournament.

Public Speaking
In 2011, SMK Bandar Utama emerged champion in the Petaling Utama District Level Public Speaking competition held in SMK Damansara Utama. A few days later representing the district for the Selangor State Level Public Speaking competition and emerged second place.

References

External links

Schools in Selangor